Hitman's Wife's Bodyguard is a 2021 American action comedy film directed by Patrick Hughes and written by Tom O'Connor and Brandon and Phillip Murphy. The film is a sequel to the 2017 film The Hitman's Bodyguard and features Ryan Reynolds, Samuel L. Jackson, Salma Hayek, and Richard E. Grant reprising their roles, with Frank Grillo, Antonio Banderas, and Morgan Freeman joining the cast. In the film, suspended bodyguard Michael Bryce (Reynolds) must once again team up with hitman Darius Kincaid (Jackson) and his wife (Hayek) to stop a madman (Banderas) from launching a terror attack on Europe.

Hitman's Wife's Bodyguard was theatrically released in the United States on June 16, 2021, by Lionsgate. The film received generally negative reviews from critics and grossed $70.1 million on a $70 million budget.

Plot
Michael Bryce, temporarily retired from being a bodyguard while he awaits reinstatement of his license, tries to clear his mind in on vacation in Capri until Sonia Kincaid tracks him down and asks for his services. She needs his help in recovering her hitman husband Darius, after mobsters kidnap him.

After saving Darius, Bryce and Kincaid are caught by Interpol agent Bobby O'Neill, who needs their help in locating terrorist mastermind Aristotle Papadopoulos. He wants to destroy the European power grid and infrastructure as the European Union is planning to impose more sanctions on Greece.

The trio gets into more trouble, with Bryce taking much of the physical brunt of their encounters. After getting help from his bodyguard stepfather, Bryce Senior, the trio is captured by Aristotle's henchmen. He has a history with Sonia; Aristotle was conned by her even though he genuinely fell in love with her.

Aristotle turns Sonia against Darius, so he and Bryce are forced to flee. Senior is revealed to be working with Aristotle and betrays Bryce. Bryce and Kincaid compose themselves and work together to rescue Sonia and thwart Aristotle.

After killing Aristotle's henchmen, Darius and Bryce disrupt his plan to drill into and damage the European power grid and communications and fight Aristotle and Senior. Bryce kills Senior after telling him about his eternal loyalty and friendship with Kincaid, while Kincaid and Sonia kill Aristotle.

Bryce manages to hit the manual override to destroy the ship and stop the drill, and the three survive the explosion. O'Neill says they have to stay on the boat for 48 hours together before being cleared and free, then hands Bryce papers to sign, which he thinks is his bodyguard license.

Bryce signs them only to find out they are adoption papers for him to become the son of Sonia and Kincaid, much to the horror of both Bryce and Kincaid. Bryce despondently jumps off the yacht he is piloting while Sonia and Darius have sex inside.

Cast
 Ryan Reynolds as Michael Bryce, Michael Sr.’s stepson and a bodyguard-for-hire on mandatory sabbatical which leaves him without the authority to use lethal weaponry.
 Ivor Bagaric as young Michael Bryce
 Samuel L. Jackson as Darius Kincaid, a world renowned hitman.
 Salma Hayek as Sonia Kincaid, Darius' wife.
 Frank Grillo as Bobby O'Neill, a Boston-based agent working with Interpol.
 Antonio Banderas as Aristotle Papadopoulos, a Greek shipping tycoon.
 Morgan Freeman as Michael Bryce Sr., Michael's stepfather and Papadopoulos' head of security.
 Richard E. Grant as Mr. Seifert, an old associate of Bryce and a drug addict.
 Tom Hopper as Magnusson, a famous bodyguard employed by Papadopoulos. 
 Kristofer Kamiyasu as Zento, a famous Japanese hitman employed by Papadopoulos.
 Caroline Goodall as Superintendent Crowley, a senior Interpol agent. 
 Alice McMillan as Ailso, Crowley's Scottish Interpol translator and O'Neill's assistant.
 Gabriella Wright as Veronika
 Dragan Mićanović as Vlad
 Rebecca Front as Michael's therapist
 Blake Ritson as Gunther
 Miltos Yerolemou as Carlo

Gary Oldman is briefly seen as Vladislav Dukhovich through archive footage from the first film. Additionally, director Patrick Hughes appears as a bouncer at the club.

Production
In May 2018, it was announced that Ryan Reynolds, Samuel L. Jackson, and Salma Hayek were in early talks to reprise their roles for a sequel to the 2017 film The Hitman's Bodyguard, with plans to begin filming later in the year. While Lionsgate was in talks to secure the United States distribution rights, Patrick Hughes was also in talks to return for directing duties. In November 2018, Lionsgate acquired the US rights from Millennium Films, while Matt O'Toole and Les Weldon would produce the film through Millennium and Campbell Grobman Films, and Hughes would return to direct the film from the script by Tom O'Connor, Brandon Murphy and Phillip Murphy. Reynolds, Jackson, and Hayek also officially signed on to star in the sequel. In March 2019, Frank Grillo, Morgan Freeman, Antonio Banderas and Tom Hopper joined the cast of the film, with Richard E. Grant reprising his role from the first.

Filming began on March 2, 2019, in Europe. Filming took place in Italy (Trieste), Croatia (Rovinj, Rijeka, Karlovac, Zagreb, Jastrebarsko, Pisarovina, Motovun, Buje, Vodnjan, Lim Channel and Biševo), Slovenia, Bulgaria and United Kingdom.

Release
Lionsgate Films released the film on June 16, 2021, after being previously delayed to August 20, 2021, from an original release date of August 28, 2020 due to the COVID-19 pandemic.

Reception

Box office
Hitman's Wife's Bodyguard  grossed $38 million in the United States and Canada, and $32 million in other territories, for a worldwide total of $70.1 million.

In the United States and Canada, the film was projected to gross around $15 million from 3,331 theaters over its five-day opening weekend. The film made $3.9 million on its first day of release, including $1.8 million from advanced screenings the weekend before and $815,000 from Tuesday night previews. It went on to gross $11.4 million in its opening weekend and $16.7 million over the five days, topping the box office. It fell 57% to $4.9 million in its second weekend, finishing in third, then $3 million in its third weekend, including $3.8 million over the four-day 4th of July frame.

Critical response
On review aggregator Rotten Tomatoes, the film holds an approval rating of 26% based on 192 reviews, with an average rating of 5.8/10. The site's critics consensus reads: "Despite the charms of its ensemble, The Hitman's Wife's Bodyguard fails to protect the audience from repetitive and tired genre tropes." On Metacritic, the film has weighted average score of 32 out of 100 based on reviews from 36 critics, indicating "generally unfavorable reviews". Audiences polled by CinemaScore gave the film an average grade of "B" on an A+ to F scale, while PostTrak reported 75% of audience members gave it a positive score, with 53% saying they would definitely recommend it.

Alonso Duralde of the TheWrap wrote: "Hitman's Wife Bodyguard is a comedy with not one legitimate laugh, and an action movie where cars keep blowing up while the A-listers yell at each other, as though that were inherently amusing or entertaining." From The Hollywood Reporter, David Rooney said: "Screenwriters Tom O'Connor, Phillip Murphy and Brandon Murphy display no interest in how credible characters — even cartoonishly exaggerated comic ones — might really behave under circumstances like these, which wouldn't be so bad if the movie were funnier. But its occasional laughs drown in a sea of action-comedy tropes that have been stale for decades."

Future
In June 2021, Patrick Hughes stated that a third film is in development with the basic plot including an additional main cast member, already mapped out. By July, the filmmaker acknowledged that the end of the film leaves opportunity open for additional installments. Hughes stated: "the ending of this film lends itself to more suffering for Michael Bryce, so that can continue for eternity because I certainly love watching Ryan suffer. If there's potential to do it further, then we certainly are going to pursue that."

References

External links
 
 

2021 action comedy films
2021 action thriller films
American action comedy films
American action thriller films
American sequel films
Films about bodyguards
Films about Interpol
Films about terrorism in Europe
Films directed by Patrick Hughes
Films scored by Atli Örvarsson
Films set in Athens
Films set in Capri, Campania
Films set in Florence
Films set in Italy
Films set in Lazio
Films set in Liguria
Films set in Luxembourg
Films set in Rome
Films set in Tuscany
Films set in Zagreb
Films postponed due to the COVID-19 pandemic
Films shot in Croatia
Films shot in Italy
Films shot in Slovenia
Films shot in Bulgaria
Films shot in the United Kingdom
Lionsgate films
2020s English-language films
2020s American films